The men's 200 metre freestyle event at the 2000 Summer Olympics took place on 17–18 September at the Sydney International Aquatic Centre in Sydney, Australia. There were 51 competitors from 44 nations, with each nation having up to two swimmers (a limit in place since 1984).

Dutchman Pieter van den Hoogenband edged out Australia's top favorite Ian Thorpe on the final lap to claim a gold medal in the event. Stunning a massive home crowd, he touched the wall first in 1:45.35 to match his own world record from the semifinals. As a result of starting harder than usual, Thorpe ended up only with a silver in 1:45.83, while Italy's Massimiliano Rosolino added a bronze to his hardware from the 400 m freestyle in a time 1:46.65. The medals were the first in the men's 200 metre freestyle for both the Netherlands and Italy.

U.S. swimmer Josh Davis missed the podium by six hundredths of a second (0.06), finishing with a new American record of 1:46.73. Davis was followed in fifth and sixth by British duo Paul Palmer (1:47.95) and James Salter (1:48.74). Canada's Rick Say (1:48.76) and another Aussie Grant Hackett (1:49.46) closed out the field.

Earlier in the semifinals, Van den Hoogenband blasted a new world record of 1:45.35, slashing 0.16 seconds off the mark set by Thorpe from the Australian trials. One heat later, Thorpe powered home with a second-fastest time of 1:45.37, but missed taking the record back by two hundredths of a second (0.02). He also erased Yevgeny Sadovyi's 1992 Olympic record by 0.14 seconds to pick up a top seed from the prelims (1:46.56).

Background

This was the 11th appearance of the 200 metre freestyle event. It was first contested in 1900. It would be contested a second time, though at 220 yards, in 1904. After that, the event did not return until 1968; since then, it has been on the programme at every Summer Games.

Four of the 8 finalists from the 1996 Games returned: fourth-place finisher Pieter van den Hoogenband of the Netherlands, sixth-place finisher Massimiliano Rosolino of Italy, seventh-place finisher Josh Davis of the United States, and eighth-place finisher Paul Palmer of Great Britain. Rosolino had taken silver at the 1998 World Championships, with van den Hoogenband bronze. Australia's Michael Klim had won those World Championships, but the Australian team in Sydney was Grant Hackett and world record holder and home country favourite Ian Thorpe.

Andorra, Belarus, Cyprus, the Czech Republic, India, Lithuania, and Trinidad and Tobago each made their debut in the event. Australia made its 11th appearance, the only nation to have competed in all prior editions of the event.

Competition format

The competition altered the format that had been used since 1984. The tournament expanded to three rounds: heats, semifinals, and a final. The advancement rule followed the format introduced in 1952. A swimmer's place in the heat was not used to determine advancement; instead, the fastest times from across all heats in a round were used. Instead of having the top 16 swimmers divided into a Final A for the top 8 and Final B for 9th through 16th, as was done in from 1984 to 1996, the 2000 competition added semifinals. The top 16 swimmers from the heats competed in the new semifinals. The top 8 semifinalists advanced to the final (there was no longer a classification final for 9th through 16th). Swim-offs were used as necessary to break ties.

This swimming event used freestyle swimming, which means that the method of the stroke is not regulated (unlike backstroke, breaststroke, and butterfly events). Nearly all swimmers use the front crawl or a variant of that stroke. Because an Olympic-size swimming pool is 50 metres long, this race consisted of four lengths of the pool.

Records

Prior to this competition, the existing world and Olympic records were as follows.

The following new world and Olympic records were set during this competition.

Schedule

All times are Australian Eastern Standard Time (UTC+10)

Results

Heats

The top 16 across all heats advanced to the semifinals.

Semifinals

Final

References

External links
Official Olympic Report

F
200 metre freestyle at the Olympics
Men's events at the 2000 Summer Olympics